Grabrovnik is a village in northern Croatia, part of the Štrigova municipality within Međimurje County.

History

An urbarium from year 1672 mentions a vineyard on Ciganjščak hill (Vinea Cziganschyak). The vineyard was in possession of Zrinski noble family.

Geography

Grabrovnik is located in part of Međimurje called Gornje Međimurje. Settlement is about 17 kilometres northwest from Čakovec, and some 110 kilometres north of Zagreb.

Landscape of Grabrovnik consist of low hills called Međimurske gorice, covered with vineyards, orchards, and woodlands. Village is located on road that connects county seat Čakovec with town of Ljutomer in Slovenia.

Grabrovnik had a population of 274 in 2011 census. Grabrovnik is experiencing population decline since 1950s.

References

Footnotes

Citations

Populated places in Međimurje County